G. Brent Dalrymple (born May 9, 1937) is an American geologist, author of The Age of the Earth and Ancient Earth, Ancient Skies, and National Medal of Science winner.

He was born in Alhambra, California. After receiving a Ph.D. from University of California, Berkeley, Dalrymple went to work at the U.S. Geological Survey (USGS) in Menlo Park, California. In 1994 he left the USGS to accept a position at Oregon State University, where he served on the faculty until retiring in 2001. He is a member of the National Academy of Sciences.

In 2003, Dalrymple was awarded the National Medal of Science. He was presented with the Medal at a ceremony in 2005.

Since 2013, Dalrymple has been listed on the Advisory Council of the National Center for Science Education.

Selected publications

References

Sources 
 American Geophysical Union (includes photo)

External links 

Oral history interview transcript with Brent Dalrymple on 7 June 2021, American Institute of Physics, Niels Bohr Library & Archives
A Natural History of Time by Brent Dalrymple
Brent Dalrymple Oral History Interview

1937 births
American geologists
Critics of creationism
Occidental College alumni
Oregon State University faculty
University of California, Berkeley alumni
Living people
National Medal of Science laureates
United States Geological Survey personnel
Members of the United States National Academy of Sciences
Fellows of the American Geophysical Union
Tectonicists